Aleksandr Igorevich Bukachyov (born 7 March 1996) is a Russian football player.

Club career
He was plays for FC Tom Tomsk and made his professional debut in the Russian Professional Football League for FC Tom-2 Tomsk on 19 July 2014 in a game against FC Yakutiya Yakutsk.

He made his Russian Premier League debut for FC Tom Tomsk on 3 March 2017 in a game against FC Rostov.

References

External links
 

1996 births
Sportspeople from Omsk
Living people
Russian footballers
Association football defenders
FC Tom Tomsk players
Russian Premier League players
FC Irtysh Omsk players